SpaghettiOs is an American brand of canned ring-shaped pasta pieces that are always in tomato sauce. It is marketed to parents as "less messy" than regular spaghetti. More than 150 million cans of SpaghettiOs are sold each year. They are sold in tomato sauce and with additions including meatballs, pieces of processed meat resembling hot dog slices, beef-filled ravioli, and calcium-fortified spaghetti.

While SpaghettiOs is a trade name, the equivalent food made by various manufacturers is available in many countries as 'spaghetti hoops', 'spaghetti loops', or 'spaghetti rings'.

History 
Canned spaghetti—short lengths in tomato sauce—was available long before rings were introduced. Ring-shaped canned pasta was introduced in 1965 by the Campbell Soup Company under the Franco-American brand, by marketing manager Donald Goerke, nicknamed "the Daddy-O of SpaghettiOs", as a pasta dish that could be eaten without  mess. Other shapes considered included cowboys, Native Americans, astronauts, stars, and sports-themed shapes. Goerke created over 100 products during his 35 years with Campbell, including the Chunky line of soups. SpaghettiOs were introduced nationally without test marketing and with television advertising using the tag line "the neat round spaghetti you can eat with a spoon" and the jingle "Uh-Oh! SpaghettiOs" (these six notes are based on the earlier "Franco-American" jingle) sung by Jimmie Rodgers (loosely based on his 1950s song "Oh-Oh, I'm Falling in Love Again"). Other companies rapidly produced their own spaghetti hoops.

Nutrition
Ingredients of SpaghettiOs Original are: water, tomato puree (water, tomato paste), enriched pasta (wheat flour, niacin, ferrous sulfate, thiamine mononitrate, riboflavin, folic acid), high-fructose corn syrup, contains less than 2% of: salt, enzyme modified cheddar cheese (cheddar cheese [cultured milk, salt, enzymes, calcium chloride], water, disodium phosphate, enzymes), vegetable oil (corn, canola, and/or soybean), enzyme modified butter, skim milk, beta carotene for color, citric acid, paprika extract, flavoring. Potential allergens: wheat and milk.

The Environmental Working Group assessed the nutrition, ingredients, and processing of Spaghettios in Tomato and Cheese Sauce, producing detailed results and a weighted score of 6.0/10 (lower is better), typical for this type of foodstuff.

Issues

Recall
In June 2010, Campbell recalled 15 million lbs (6.8 million kg) of SpaghettiOs with Meatballs (all that had been produced since December 2008 minus the large fraction that had already been consumed) due to the malfunction of a cooker at one of the company's Texas plants. No reports of illnesses associated with the product and no customer complaints were recorded at the time of the recall.

Pearl Harbor tweet
On December 7, 2013, the 72nd anniversary of the Japanese attack on Pearl Harbor, SpaghettiOs' Twitter account posted a picture of a smiling cartoon SpaghettiO holding the U.S. flag and captioned, "Take a moment to remember #PearlHarbor with us." The posting was met with criticism by users, who found the tweet to be disrespectful to those who were affected by the attack. The post also quickly spawned parodies, as other users such as comedian Patton Oswalt edited the cartoon SpaghettiO into photos of other national tragedies such as the assassination of John F. Kennedy, 9/11, the Hindenburg disaster, the Space Shuttle Challenger explosion, and the sinking of the Titanic. SpaghettiOs quickly removed the tweet in question and apologized for any offense it may have caused.

Actress and comedian Natasha Leggero faced criticism for remarks regarding the tweet during NBC's New Year's Eve with Carson Daly later that month, where she quipped that "it sucks that the only survivors of Pearl Harbor are being mocked by the only food they can still chew." In response, Leggero remarked that "the amazing courage of American veterans and specifically those who survived Pearl Harbor is [not] in any way diminished by a comedian making a joke about dentures on television".

See also
 Alphabet pasta
 Chef Boyardee
 Filipino spaghetti

References

External links

 
 Image of SpaghettiOs with meatballs ad

Products introduced in 1965
Campbell Soup Company brands
American pasta dishes
Convenience foods